Ancestral civilisation or ancestral people is a term used to refer to ancient inhabitants of a modern country, in which that civilisation had its center or birthplace. Despite the fact that they lack the legal continuity of predecessor states, ancestral civilisations are foundational to the culture of contemporary countries.
Ancient Civilizations can have a major role in the identity of modern nations. Examples include Ancient Greece and Ancient China in the national identities of their modern equivalents.

See also

Ancient history

References

Ancient history
Historiography